Phytanic acid (or 3,7,11,15-tetramethyl hexadecanoic acid) is a branched chain fatty acid that humans can obtain through the consumption of dairy products, ruminant animal fats, and certain fish. Western diets are estimated to provide 50–100 mg of phytanic acid per day. In a study conducted in Oxford, individuals who consumed meat had, on average, a 6.7-fold higher geometric mean plasma phytanic acid concentration than did vegans.

Human pathology
Unlike most fatty acids, phytanic acid cannot be metabolized by β-oxidation. Instead, it undergoes α-oxidation in the peroxisome, where it is converted into pristanic acid by the removal of one carbon. Pristanic acid can undergo several rounds of β-oxidation in the peroxisome to form medium chain fatty acids that can be converted to carbon dioxide and water in mitochondria.

Individuals with adult Refsum disease, an autosomal recessive neurological disorder caused by mutations in the PHYH gene, have impaired α-oxidation activity and accumulate large stores of phytanic acid in their blood and tissues. This frequently leads to peripheral polyneuropathy, cerebellar ataxia, retinitis pigmentosa, anosmia, and hearing loss.

Presence in other organisms
In ruminant animals, the gut fermentation of ingested plant materials liberates phytol, a constituent of chlorophyll, which is then converted to phytanic acid and stored in fats. In contrast to observations made in humans, there is indirect evidence that diverse non-human primates, including the great apes other than humans (bonobos, chimpanzees, gorillas and orangutans), can derive significant amounts of phytanic acid from the hindgut fermentation of plant materials.

Freshwater sponges contain terpenoid acids such as 4,8,12-trimethyltridecanoic, phytanic and pristanic acids, which indicates that these acids may have chemotaxonomical significance for both marine and freshwater sponges.

Insects, such as the sumac flea beetle, are reported to use phytol and its metabolites (e.g. phytanic acid) as chemical deterrents against predation. These compounds originate from host plants.

Modulator of transcription
Phytanic acid and its metabolites have been reported to bind to and/or activate the transcription factors PPAR-alpha and retinoid X receptor (RXR).

References

Alkanoic acids
Diterpenes